The Corniche (or Corniche Road) is located in the city of Abu Dhabi, the capital of the United Arab Emirates. The Corniche is 8 km long, and includes children's play areas, separate cycle and pedestrian pathways, restaurants, cafés and the Corniche Beach.

It forms a sweeping curve on the western side of the main Abu Dhabi island and is replete with cycle paths, fountains and park areas. Between 2002 and 2004, land was reclaimed from the sea and the Corniche was extended. Some of the earlier landmarks - the volcano fountain and Abu Dhabi clocktower - were demolished in the process. Certain parts of the Corniche have significant deposition of sand, with people using the area as a public beach. Prior to the 1970s, the current area occupied by the Corniche was a beach, where dhows and ships used to anchor and transfer cargo or people; at the time, the Mina Zayed area was not yet constructed.

Marina Mall is located across from the Corniche and can be accessed using a narrow breakwater road. At Marina Mall, the UAE flag is hoisted and holds the record for being one of the tallest flagpoles in the world.

Lulu Island is a tiny reclaimed island located about a kilometer from the corniche. The Emirates Palace Hotel is at the southern end of the corniche. There are a number of skyscrapers along the corniche, with newer taller skyscrapers being built on the southern end.

Abu Dhabi ladies beach was located at one end of the Corniche but it was closed a few years ago, as the government wanted to build a Palace.

See also
 Corniche
 Mina Zayed
 Marine Drive, Mumbai, a similar area in Mumbai (Bombay)

External links
ABU DHABI CORNICHE
Dhabi Corniche

References

Roads in the United Arab Emirates
Geography of Abu Dhabi
Tourist attractions in Abu Dhabi
Abi Dhabi Corniche